Unipress, UniPress or UNIPRESS may refer to

 A division of the scholarly publishing house, Vandenhoeck & Ruprecht
 United Press International, an international news agency
 The Institute of High Pressure Physics of the Polish Academy of Sciences
 Unipress Software Inc, an American software company acquired by Numara Software in 2002

See also
 Unipres